Munawar Humayun Khan is the Chairperson of SRSP and the wife of a former Pakistani diplomat, Dr. Humayun Khan.

Philanthropic and benevolent activities 
Mrs Khan Chairs the board of directors of Sarhad Rural Support Programme (SRSP), which is one of Pakistan's largest NGO, she has 15 years of experience working with people at grass roots for empowerment and poverty reduction. She is on the Board of many other not-for-profit organizations including: Pakistan Center for Philanthropy (PCP), Dost - Drug Rehabilitation Center, Ghazi Barotha Taraqiati Idara and the Rural Support Programmes Network (RSPN). She also Chairs the Board of Directors of Agribusiness Support Fund (ASF).

References

Living people
Rural development in Pakistan
Pakistani social workers
Pakistani philanthropists
Year of birth missing (living people)